Deep End is a 1970 romantic drama film directed by Jerzy Skolimowski and starring Jane Asher and John Moulder Brown. Set in London, the film focuses on the relationship between two young colleagues at a suburban bath house and swimming pool.

In 2009, Bavaria Media, a subsidiary of Bavaria Film, which co-produced the film in 1970 through its subsidiary Maran Film, began a digital restoration as part of the film's 40th anniversary, in co-operation with the British Film Institute. The restored film was re-released in UK cinemas on 6 May 2011 and was released on Blu-ray Disc and DVD on 18 July 2011 in BFI's BFI Flipside series. In March 2012, it was first shown on TV by Film4.

Plot
Mike (John Moulder Brown), a 15-year-old drop-out, finds a job in a public bath. There he is trained by his colleague Susan (Jane Asher), a woman 10 years his senior. Susan is a tease who plays with Mike's and other men's feelings, acting sometimes warm and affectionate and other times cold and distant. Working at the baths turns out to involve providing services to clients of a more or less sexual nature, in exchange for a tip. For example, an older woman (Diana Dors) is sexually stimulated by pushing Mike's head into her bosom and talking suggestively about football. Mike is confused by this and at first does not want to accept the tip he gets, but Susan tells him that these services are a normal practice, including exchange of her female clients for his male clients whenever a client prefers the opposite sex.

Mike fantasises about Susan and falls in love with her, even though she has a wealthy young fiancé, Chris (Chris Sandford). Mike also discovers that Susan is cheating on her fiancé with an older, married man (Karl Michael Vogler) who was Mike's physical education teacher and works at the baths as a swimming instructor for teenage girls, touching them inappropriately. Mike begins following Susan on her dates with Chris and the instructor and trying to disrupt them. Although Susan often gets angry at Mike for this, she provides just enough encouragement to cause him to continue the behavior. Mike's infatuation with Susan continues despite his friends mocking him, his mother being treated rudely by Susan, his bicycle being destroyed by Susan, and his activities drawing the ire of Susan's boyfriends, local police, and Mike's boss at work. Obsessed with Susan, Mike refuses other outlets for sex, such as his former girlfriend and a prostitute who offers him a discount. While following Susan on a date, Mike sees and steals a life-sized advertising photo cut-out of a naked girl who resembles Susan. He confronts Susan with it on the London Underground, flying into a violent tantrum in front of other passengers when Susan teasingly refuses to tell him whether she posed for the nude photo. Mike then takes the cut-out to the deserted baths after hours and swims naked with it, embracing it.

The next morning, Mike disrupts the instructor's foot race and punctures the tyres of the instructor's car while Susan is driving it. Susan gets mad and hits Mike, in the process losing the diamond from her new engagement ring in the snow. Anxious to find the lost diamond, Mike and Susan collect the surrounding snow in plastic bags and take it back to the closed baths to melt it, using exposed electrical wiring from a lowered ceiling lamp outlet to heat an electric kettle in the empty pool. While Susan is briefly out of the room, Mike finds the diamond in the melted snow, and lies down naked in the dry pool with the diamond on his tongue. He teases Susan by refusing to give her the diamond until she undresses. She does so, he gives her the diamond and she is about to leave, but she reconsiders and lies down next to him. They have a sexual encounter, although it is not clear whether Mike is able to perform.

Chris then telephones and Susan rushes around the empty pool hurriedly gathering her clothes to go and meet him. Mike begs her to stay and talk to him, but Susan insists she has to leave. Meanwhile, an attendant has arrived, who, unaware of the presence of Mike and Susan, opens the valve to start filling the dry pool with water. Mike becomes more insistent, chasing Susan around the rapidly filling pool, and finally hitting her in the head with the ceiling lamp, severely injuring her. She falls (along with a tin of red paint that resembles blood) into the water of the pool. Mike embraces the dying, nude Susan underwater, just as he embraced the photo cut-out. Meanwhile, water continues to fill the pool with the live-electrical wire dangling within.

Cast

 Jane Asher as Susan
 John Moulder-Brown as Mike
 Karl Michael Vogler as swimming instructor
 Chris Sandford as Chris, the fiancé
 Diana Dors as Mike's first lady client
 Louise Martini as prostitute
 Erica Beer as baths cashier
 Anita Lochner as Kathy
 Annemarie Kuster as nightclub receptionist
 Cheryl Hall as red hat girl
 Christina Paul as white cloth girl

 Dieter Eppler as stoker
 Karl Ludwig Lindt as baths manager
 Eduard Linkers as cinema owner
 Will Danin as younger policeman
 Gerald Rowland as Mike's friend
 Burt Kwouk as hot dog stand man
 Ursula Mellin as Mike's second lady client (uncredited)
 Erika Wackernagel as Mike's mother (uncredited)
 Uli Steigberg as Mike's father/policeman (uncredited)
 Peter Martin Urtel as older policeman (uncredited)
 Jerzy Skolimowski as passenger on tube reading Polish newspaper (uncredited)

Production
The film was made in about six months from conception to completion. It was shot largely in Munich, and some exterior scenes were shot in London's Soho and Leytonstone. The cast members could improvise and were told to remain in character even when a scene was not going as planned.

The film features the song "Mother Sky" by the band Can in an extended sequence set in Soho, and a previously unreleased version of the song "But I Might Die Tonight" by Cat Stevens in the opening scene and finale; this version was eventually released in 2020.

Many years after the film's release, Jane Asher denied suggestions that she had used a body double for some of her scenes: "I certainly didn't!...And, looking back, I like the way it's done."

The film was one of a series of supporting performances by Diana Dors that helped reestablish her career.

Reception
The film received critical acclaim, with Andrew Sarris comparing it with the best of Godard, Truffaut and Polanski, and Penelope Gilliatt called it "a work of peculiar, cock-a-hoop gifts". "The consensus when it premiered at the Venice Film Festival in September 1970 was that it would have been assured of winning the Golden Lion, if only the prize-giving hadn't been suspended the previous year." Roger Ebert of the Chicago Sun-Times gave the film two-and-a-half stars out of four and called it an "observant and sympathetic movie" that "deserves a better ending." Roger Greenspun of The New York Times wrote "Although it has a strong and good story, Deep End is put together out of individual, usually comic routines. Many of these don't work, but many more work very well." Variety observed "Sharply-edged hues, taut editing, a fine musical accomp, good playing alongside the leads and Skolimowsky's frisky, playful but revealing direction make this a pic with commercial legs and yet with a personalized quality for more selective spots." Gene Siskel of the Chicago Tribune gave the film three-and-a-half stars out of four and declared it "a stunning introduction to a talented film maker," praising the "delicious humor and eroticism" as Skolimowski "plays with the audience much in the same way that Miss Asher entices Brown." Kevin Thomas of the Los Angeles Times declared the film "a masterpiece" that "shows Skolimowski to be a major film-maker, impassioned yet disciplined. He runs an elonquent camera and evokes fine performances. (Moulder Brown and Miss Asher really are flawless)." Gary Arnold of The Washington Post wrote "Judging from Deep End, Skolimowski has a fairly distinctive film personality, but it happens to be a split personality, split in a way—half-Truffaut, half-Polanski—that I find rather disconcerting and unappealing. Imagine a film like Stolen Kisses turning, at about the half-way point, into a film like 'Repulsion' and you have Deep End." Nigel Andrews of The Monthly Film Bulletin called it "a study in the growth of obsession that is both funny and frighteningly exact."

In an interview with NME in 1982, David Lynch said of Deep End "I don't like colour movies and I can hardly think about colour. It really cheapens things for me and there's never been a colour movie I've freaked out over except one, this thing called Deep End, which had really great art direction."

The film has a score of 85% on Rotten Tomatoes, based on 20 reviews, with a weighted average of 7.42/10.

References

External links
 
 
 
 
  (with video from Q&A session with Jane Asher and John Moulder-Brown after first showing of the restored version, 4 May 2011)
 Optimism Unfulfilled: Jerzy Skolimowski's Deep End and the Swinging Sixties, an article by Christopher Weedman, at Senses of Cinema
 Deep End: Ripe for Rediscovery - TCM Movie Morlocks

1970 films
1970s coming-of-age drama films
1970 drama films
1970s psychological thriller films
British coming-of-age drama films
British psychological thriller films
English-language German films
British teen drama films
Films about infidelity
Films directed by Jerzy Skolimowski
Films with screenplays by Jerzy Skolimowski
Films set in London
German coming-of-age drama films
German teen drama films
German psychological thriller films
Juvenile sexuality in films
West German films
1970s English-language films
1970s British films
1970s German films